The sarronca is a Portuguese traditional musical instrument, more precisely a rubbed membranophone.

It is composed of a stretched skin over a hollow container that serves as a resonance box (which may be a can, a jug, a wooden cylinder or similar). The center of the skin is pierced by a wood stick or a reed, and the sound is obtained by moving the rod downward and upward, so that the rod rubs the stretched skin.

References

Portuguese musical instruments